The Grammy Award for Best Rap Song is an honor presented at the Grammy Awards, a ceremony that was established in 1958 and originally called the Gramophone Awards, to recording artists for quality songs in the rap music genre. Honors in several categories are presented at the ceremony annually by the National Academy of Recording Arts and Sciences of the United States to "honor artistic achievement, technical proficiency and overall excellence in the recording industry, without regard to album sales or chart position".

The award was first presented to Eminem along with Jeff Bass and Luis Resto for the song "Lose Yourself" from the soundtrack 8 Mile in 2004. According to the 54th Grammy Awards description guide, the award honors the songwriter(s) of new songs (containing both music and lyrics) or songs "first achieving prominence during the period of eligibility". Songs containing prominent samples may be eligible. The award goes to the songwriter(s), not to the artist except if the artist is also a songwriter of the winning song.

Kanye West holds the records for the most wins and nominations in this category, having won seven times out of sixteen nominations. West, Jay-Z, Pharrell Williams, Drake and Kendrick Lamar are the only songwriters to have won the category more than once. Cyhi the Prynce holds the record for most nominations without a win, with six.

Recipients

Category records
Most wins

Most nominations

See also
 Grammy Award for Best Rap Performance
 List of Grammy Award categories

References

External links
Official site of the Grammy Awards

Rap Song
Rap Song
Song awards
Songwriting awards